David Alexander Hill (16 December 1881 – 21 May 1928) was a Scottish footballer who played as a left back.

Career
Born in St Quivox, South Ayrshire, Hill played club football for Third Lanark, playing on the losing side in the 1906 Scottish Cup Final (he had been with the club when they won the same trophy the previous season, but was only a reserve player and was not selected for the match) and made one appearance for Scotland in 1906.

References

1881 births
1928 deaths
Scottish footballers
Scotland international footballers
Scottish Football League players
Ayr Parkhouse F.C. players
Third Lanark A.C. players
Association football fullbacks
Place of death missing
Footballers from South Ayrshire